Kankar or kunkur is a sedimentological term derived from Hindi, occasionally applied in India and the United States to detrital or residual rolled, often nodular calcium carbonate formed in soils of semi-arid regions. 

It forms sheets across alluvial plains and can occur as discontinuous lines of nodular kankar or as indurated layers in stratigraphic profiles more commonly referred to as calcrete, hardpan or duricrust.

See also
 Caliche (mineral)

Sedimentology